Amorosi is a comune (municipality) in the Province of Benevento in the Italian region Campania.

Amorosi may also refer to:
Antonio Amorosi (1660–1738), Italian late-Baroque painter
Vanessa Amorosi (born 1981), Australian musician

See also
Amoroso (disambiguation)
Amoruso, a surname